The Belgium national under-21 football team is the national under-21 football team of Belgium and is controlled by the Belgian Football Association. The team competes in the European Under-21 Football Championship, held every two years. Their biggest successes were winning the 2007–09 International Challenge Trophy and reaching the European Championship semi-finals in 2007 in the Netherlands. Thanks to the latter achievement, Belgium qualified for the football tournament at the 2008 Summer Olympics. Their current home stadium is Den Dreef in Leuven.

UEFA U-21 Championship Record

Results and fixtures

Belgium are currently competing for qualification to the 2019 UEFA European Under-21 Championship. The table below shows their current standing in the qualification group.

Results

Current squad
 The following players were called up for the international friendly matches against the Czech Republic and Japan.
 Match dates: 24 & 27 March 2023
 Opposition:  & 
Caps and goals correct as of: 26 September 2022, after the match against .

Recent call-ups
The following players have been called up and remain eligible.

Statistics

Most capped players

Last updated: 22 June 2019Source: Belgian Football Federation

Top goalscorers

Last updated: 20 March 2019Source: Belgian Football Federation

Honours
International Challenge Trophy
Winners (1): 2007–09
Runners-up (1): 2005–06

See also

 Belgium national football team
 Belgium national under-19 football team
 Belgium national under-17 football team
 European Under-21 Football Championship

References

References and external links
 UEFA Under-21 website, complete results archive
 The Rec.Sport.Soccer Statistics Foundation, full record of U-21 and U-23 Championships

European national under-21 association football teams
Football